Rafael Barajas Durán, better known by his pen name  ("The Rubbernecker" or "The Peeper" in Spanish) is a Mexican cartoonist and illustrator who received the 1999 National Journalism Prize of Mexico for Editorial Cartooning.

The son of a schoolteacher and a psychoanalyst, Barajas was born on 1 January 1956 in Mexico City and graduated from the National Autonomous University of Mexico (UNAM) in 1978 with a bachelor's degree in Architecture. At the age of 20 he decided to become a cartoonist and eventually sent collaborations to the Sunday supplement of Unomásuno (1981–1984), designed covers for Nexos magazine (1984–1986) and received a Guggenheim Fellowship (2003) to study dissenting political cartoonists in Mexico who worked between 1872 and 1910.

According to himself, Barajas is also a committed leftist activist who has led campaigns to support the Zapatista rebels in Chiapas and regularly promote student involvement in politics.

Books
  ("Selected Leftovers", 1987).
  ("I am being carried away by NAFTA", 1993).
  ("The Six-Years Term Makes Me Laugh", 1994). 
  ("How to Survive Neoliberalism Without Failing To Be Mexican", 1996).
  ("Towards a Global Mishmash of Excellence and Quality", 2002).
  ("A Country's History in Cartoons", 2000).
  ("El Ahuizote’s Country", 2005).
  ("Crier of Icamole’s Country", 2007).
  (published in English as "How to Succeed at Globalization: A Primer for Roadside Vendors", 2005).
  ("The Mob of Independence", 2008).
  (2008).
  ("I Only Cry When It Hurts", 2009).
  ("Sweet Vendetta", 2009).
  ("The Clouds Seller", 2009, with Elena Poniatowska).

References

External links

Living people
Mexican cartoonists
National Autonomous University of Mexico alumni
1956 births
People from Mexico City